Joshua Pieters (born 17 September 1993) is a South African YouTuber known for pranks on celebrities. Originally from Knysna, he is currently based in London.

Career 
In August 2019, Pieters pranked 40 social media influencers including Louise Thompson into believing they received a piece of Moon rock from the National Space Centre (NSC). Pieters later apologized to the NSC. In September 2019, Pieters and his YouTube partner Archie Manners created a fake restaurant, The Italian Stallion, to sell microwave meals as authentic Italian cuisine via Deliveroo. They followed this up in November 2019 with a prank at the KSI vs. Logan Paul II boxing match, where they managed to convince several YouTubers, influencers, and venue staff at the Staples Center that an Ed Sheeran lookalike was the actual Ed Sheeran.

On 27 January 2020, English far-right political commentator Katie Hopkins was pranked by Pieters into accepting a fake award, titled the "Campaign to Unify the Nation Trophy". Pieters flew Hopkins to Prague where she accepted the award and gave a speech, while the initials of the fictitious award were prominently displayed in the background, forming the swear word "cunt". Pieters uploaded the prank to his YouTube channel on the same day that Hopkins was suspended from Twitter for breaking their anti-hate rules.

, he had over 1 million subscribers on YouTube. In May 2020, Pieters and Manners pranked Big Cat Rescue CEO, Carole Baskin, into believing she was giving an interview on The Tonight Show Starring Jimmy Fallon. This was followed by a prank in October 2020 in which they posed as peace researchers and successfully nominated Gemma Collins for the Nobel Peace Prize.

On 31 July 2021, English Anti-Vaxxer Piers Corbyn was pranked by Pieters into accepting bribe money to stop spreading misinformation about Astra-Zeneca where he gave Corbyn "$10,000" in Monopoly cash.

In 2023, Pieters and Manners would launch a weather balloon with a camera towards the Chinese Embassy in London as a way to mock the Chinese spy balloon in North America.

References

External links 
 
 

21st-century comedians
Living people
People from Knysna
Prank YouTubers
South African male comedians
South African emigrants to the United Kingdom
South African YouTubers
1993 births
YouTubers from London
YouTube channels launched in 2015